Raphael Freienstein (born 8 April 1991) is a German former professional cyclist.

Major results
2013
 3rd Road race, National Under-23 Road Championships
 9th Road race, National Road Championships
2016
 6th Time trial, National Road Championships
 8th Rad am Ring
2017
 2nd Overall Flèche du Sud
1st Stage 2
 6th Overall CCC Tour-Grodów Piastowskich
 8th Road race, National Road Championships
 8th Overall Tour of Rhodes

References

External links

1991 births
Living people
German male cyclists
Sportspeople from Marburg
Cyclists from Hesse